Sirumugai is a Panchayat town in Coimbatore district in the Indian state of Tamil Nadu, which is well known for Silk Sarees Bazaars.

Geography
It has an average elevation of 292 metres (958 feet). It is situated in the northern part of Coimbatore district, on the banks of the Bhavani River.

Demographics
As of 2011 Census of India, The Sirumugai Town Panchayat has population of 18,223 of which 9,015 are males while 9,208 are females as per report released by Census India 2011.

References

Cities and towns in Coimbatore district